Mang Tomas (Filipino for "Mr. Tomas") is a condiment brand established by NutriAsia. Its core product is lechon sauce. The brand was developed by Hernan Reyes in the late 1980s after he purchased the lechon sauce recipe of Aling Pitang lechon shop located in Quiapo, Manila. Reyes named his sauce "Mang Tomas Sarsa", after a popular lechon shop located in Santa Mesa, Manila. In 1991, the brand was acquired by Southeast Asia Food, Inc. (SAFI, now NutriAsia). The product is presently sold as "Mang Tomas All-Around Sarsa" in the Philippines and as "Mang Tomas All-Purpose Sauce" in export markets. 
 
Unlike the traditional lechon sauce, Mang Tomas is made without ground liver. Liver was a listed ingredient in the internationally available Mang Tomas products until 2017, but has since been removed from the label. 

As of 2022, all Mang Tomas variations reinclude pork liver as an ingredient.

References

Further reading
Mang Tomas - Superbrands Philippines, Volume 2, pages 60 and 61

NutriAsia brands
Food brands of the Philippines
Philippine condiments
Brand name condiments